Eric Wilson may refer to:

Authors
Eric Wilson (suspense writer), American author
Eric Wilson (author) (born 1940), Canadian author

Sports
Eric Wilson (athlete) (1900–1985), American athlete
Eric Wilson (linebacker, born 1962) (born 1962), former American football player for the Buffalo Bills and Washington Redskins
Eric Wilson (linebacker, born 1994) (born 1994), American football player 
Eric Wilson (Australian footballer) (born 1945), Australian rules footballer
Eric Wilson (Canadian football) (born 1978), defensive tackle for the Montreal Alouettes

Others
Eric Wilson (artist) (1911–1946), Australian painter
Eric Wilson (bassist) (born 1970), member of Sublime
Eric Charles Twelves Wilson (1912–2008), recipient of the Victoria Cross
Eric Wilson, keyboardist and member of Wild Cub
Eric C. Wilson, one of the Norfolk Four, a group of men who are believed to be wrongfully convicted in a rape/murder in Norfolk, Virginia
Eric Wilson, murder victim and subject of the documentary Just Another Missing Kid
Erik Wilson (born 1975), Norwegian cinematographer